Curvibacter delicatus is a Gram-negative bacterium from the genus  Curvibacter and family  Comamonadaceae, which was isolated from well water.

References

External links
Type strain of Curvibacter delicatus at BacDive -  the Bacterial Diversity Metadatabase

Burkholderiaceae
Bacteria described in 2004